Glyphipterix necopina is a species of sedge moth in the genus Glyphipterix. It is endemic to New Zealand.  It is classified as Not Threatened by the Department of Conservation.

Taxonomy 
This species was described by Alfred Philpott in 1927 using a specimen he collected at Golden Downs in Nelson. George Hudson discussed and illustrated this species in his 1939 book A supplement to the butterflies and moths of New Zealand. The holotype specimen is held at the New Zealand Arthropod Collection.

Description 
Philpott described this species as follows:
G. necopina is similar in appearance to G. achlyocessa but differs as it is smaller in size and in palpal tuft as well as having less obvious streaks in disk markings.

Distribution 
This species is endemic to New Zealand. Along with the type locality, Philpott also collected specimens at Gordon's Nob near Nelson, at Seaward Moss in Invercargill in January, and at Bottle Lake and Waikuku in Canterbury in November and in March.

Biology and behaviour 
G. necopina is most abundant in January.

Host species and habitat 
This species can be found inhabiting valley marshes amongst herb plants and in dry localities in mountainous terrain.

Conservation Status 
This species has been classified as being "Not Threatened" under the New Zealand Threat Classification System.

References

Moths described in 1927
Glyphipterigidae
Moths of New Zealand
Endemic fauna of New Zealand
Endemic moths of New Zealand